The Four Olds or the Four Old Things was a term used during the Cultural Revolution by the student-led Red Guards in the People's Republic of China in reference to the pre-communist elements of Chinese culture they attempted to destroy. The Four Olds were: Old Ideas, Old Culture, Old Customs, and Old Habits (Chinese: Jiù Sīxiǎng 旧思想, Jiù Wénhuà 旧文化, Jiù Fēngsú 旧风俗, and Jiù Xíguàn 旧习惯). The campaign to destroy the Four Olds began in Beijing on August 19, 1966 (the "Red August", during which a massacre also took place in Beijing), shortly after the launch of the Cultural Revolution.

Terminology
The term "Four Olds" first appeared on June 1, 1966, in Chen Boda's People's Daily editorial, "Sweep Away All Monsters and Demons", where the Old Things were described as anti-proletarian, "fostered by the exploiting classes, [and to] have poisoned the minds of the people for thousands of years". However, which customs, cultures, habits, and ideas specifically constituted the "Four Olds" were never clearly defined.

On August 8, the Central Committee of the Chinese Communist Party used the term at its 8th National Congress. The term was endorsed on August 18 by Lin Biao at a mass rally, and from there it spread to Red Flag magazine, as well as to Red Guard publications. 

Calls to destroy the "Four Olds" usually did not appear in isolation, but were contrasted with the hope of building the "Four News" (new customs, new culture, new habits, new ideas). Newborn socialist things were said to struggle against the Four Olds. The idea that Chinese culture was responsible for China's economic backwardness and needed to be reformed had some precedent in the May Fourth Movement (1919), and was also encouraged by colonial authorities during the Japanese occupation of China.

Campaign

The campaign to Destroy the Four Olds and Cultivate the Four News began in Beijing on August 19 during the "Red August". The first things to change were the names of streets and stores: "Blue Sky Clothes Store" to "Defending Mao Zedong Clothes Store", "Cai E Road" to "Red Guard Road", and so forth. The name of the road where the Soviet embassy was stationed was changed to “Antirevisionism Road.”  Many people also changed their given names to revolutionary slogans, such as Zhihong ("Determined Red") or Jige ("Following the Revolution"). 

Other manifestations of the Red Guard campaign included giving speeches, posting big-character posters, and harassment of people, such as intellectuals, who defiantly demonstrated the Four Olds. In later stages of the campaign, examples of Chinese architecture were destroyed, classical literature and Chinese paintings were torn apart, and Chinese temples were desecrated. 

The Cemetery of Confucius was attacked in November 1966, during the Cultural Revolution, when it was visited and vandalized by a team of Red Guards from Beijing Normal University, led by Tan Houlan.
The corpse of the 76th-generation Duke Yansheng was removed from its grave and hung naked from a tree in front of the palace during the desecration of the cemetery in the Cultural Revolution.

Red Guards broke into the homes of the wealthy and destroyed paintings, books, and furniture; all were items that they viewed as part of the Four Olds. The Chinese government stopped short of endorsing the physical destruction of products. In fact, the government protected significant archaeological discoveries made during the Cultural Revolution, such as the Mawangdui, the Leshan Giant Buddha and the Terracotta Army.

Many artists and other cultural professionals were persecuted by vigilantes, although some cultural advances came about because of the period, including the integration of "new" western instruments and ballet into Peking opera. Traditional Chinese medicine also advanced despite the Four Olds campaign, most significantly by the derivation of the anti-malarial drug artemisinin from the qinghao plant. 

Upon learning that Red Guards were approaching the Forbidden City, Premier Zhou Enlai ordered the gates shut and deployed the People's Liberation Army against the Red Guards. After this incident, Zhou attempted to create a more peaceful code of conduct for the Red Guards, with the support of cadres Tao Zhu, Li Fuchuan, and Chen Yi. This plan was foiled by the ultra-leftists Kang Sheng, Jiang Qing, and Zhang Chunqiao. Although many of Zhou's other initiatives to stem the destruction failed because of their or Mao's own opposition, he did succeed in preventing Beijing from being renamed "East Is Red City" and the Chinese guardian lions in front of Tian'anmen Square from being replaced with statues of Mao.

Academic Alessandro Russo writes that the destruction of the Four Olds was an ambiguous campaign from the perspective of the Party. He argues that in a time of increasing political pluralization, the Party sought to channel student activism towards obvious class enemies and less relevant objectives to make it easier for the Party to contain the situation.

Appraisal of damage
No official statistics have ever been produced by the Communist party in terms of reporting the actual cost of damage.  By 1978, many stories of death and destruction caused by the Cultural Revolution had leaked out of China and became known worldwide.

Restoration
Starting in the 1990s and continuing into the 21st century, there has been a massive rebuilding effort under way to restore and rebuild cultural sites that were destroyed or damaged during the Cultural Revolution. This has coincided with a resurgence in interest in, and demand for, Chinese cultural artifacts.

See also

 Burning of books and burying of scholars, 3rd century BC China
 1989 Mao portrait vandalism incident,  vandalism of the portrait of Mao Zedong
 Destruction of the Goddess of Democracy, as part of the 1989 Tiananmen Square massacre
 List of campaigns of the Chinese Communist Party

References 

Cultural Revolution
Campaigns of the Chinese Communist Party
Maoist terminology
Ideology of the Chinese Communist Party
Religious persecution by communists
Persecution of intellectuals